James Sladky (March 16, 1947 – November 9, 2017) was an American competitive ice dancer. With his skating partner, Judy Schwomeyer, he became a four-time World medalist (silver in 1970; bronze in 1969, 1971, 1972) and five-time U.S. national champion (1968–1972).

Personal life 
James Sladky was born on March 16, 1947. He was married to Judy Schwomeyer from 1971 to 1990. He later married Fay Kelley. He worked as a hotel engineer in Hartford, Connecticut.

Career 
Schwomeyer/Sladky won five national titles, from 1968 to 1972. They finished on the podium at four World Championships, (winning silver in 1970 and bronze in 1969, 1971, and 1972). 
  
They were coached by Ron Ludington. Together with Ludington, Schwomeyer/Sladky created the Yankee Polka compulsory dance. They first performed it as a competitive program in 1969. Following their retirement from competitive skating, the duo skated professionally.

They were inducted into the United States Figure Skating Hall of Fame in 1991.

Results
(with Judy Schwomeyer)

References

1947 births
2017 deaths
American male ice dancers
World Figure Skating Championships medalists
American people of Czech descent
Sportspeople from Bridgeport, Connecticut